Kolomna is an ancient city in Moscow Oblast, Russia

Kolomna may also refer to:
Kolomna Municipal Okrug, a municipal okrug in Admiralteysky District of St. Petersburg, Russia
Kolomna Kremlin, a fortress in Kolomna, Moscow Oblast, Russia
Kolomna Bus Terminal, a bus terminal in Kolomna, Moscow Oblast, Russia

See also
 Kolomensky District